Allantoic acid is an organic compound with the chemical formula C4H8N4O4. It is a crystalline acid obtained by hydrolysis of allantoin.

In nature, allantoic acid is produced from allantoin by the enzyme allantoinase (encoded by the gene AllB (Uniprot: P77671) in Escherichia coli and other bacteria).

References

Ureas
Acetic acids